Anthony D. Cox (born 1936) is an American film producer and art promoter. He is a former husband of Yoko Ono.

Biography
Cox met Yoko Ono in 1961, after he saw some of her art work in an anthology and located her in Tokyo, Japan. The couple married on November 28, 1962, but the marriage was annulled on March 1, 1963, due to Ono neglecting to officially finalize her divorce from her first husband, the Japanese composer Toshi Ichiyanagi. They remarried on June 11, 1963, two months before their daughter, Kyoko Chan Cox, was born on August 8, 1963. Cox became a full-time caregiver for Kyoko, while both he and Ono continued with their art, collaborating as conceptual artists.

Ono's growing estrangement from Cox, who had left the London flat they both shared in 1967 inspired her to create her artwork Half-A-Room, and the pain of their breakup inspired Ono to make Ceiling Painting/Yes Painting.

Their marriage fell apart during 1967, partly due to Ono meeting John Lennon at an art show in late 1966.  Cox and Ono divorced on February 2, 1969. By 1970 Tony Cox had married an American woman named Melinda Kendall and had moved to Denmark with Kyoko.

After a legal battle, Cox was awarded custody of Kyoko. However, in 1971, Cox—who had joined a religious group known as the Church of the Living Word, or "The Walk", after his divorce from Ono—vanished with his wife Melinda and Kyoko in violation of the custody order. He left "The Walk" after a few years, and in 1978, Cox and Kyoko stayed with the Jesus People USA commune in Chicago. His marriage with second wife Melinda was dissolved by the cult leader prior to leaving "The Walk".

Cox and Kyoko contacted Yoko Ono after the death of Lennon in 1980, without revealing their location. Subsequently, Ono agreed not to actively attempt to locate her daughter, although she still desired to make contact. In 1994, when she was 31, Kyoko decided to re-establish her contact with Ono and the two have maintained their relationship since then.

In 1985, in an autobiographical documentary film, Vain Glory Cox discussed his experiences with the Lennons, with the Church of the Living Word, and with life on the run. The film credits Kyoko as co-producer.

See also 
List of fugitives from justice who disappeared

References

External links 
 Yoko Ono: Money Can't Buy Me Love – film in development dealing with Cox and Kyoko's relationship with Ono
  Anthony D. Cox, Appellant, v. Yoko Ono Cox., 457 F.2d 1190 (3rd Cir. 1972), Docket Number: 71-2090
 

1930s births
American conceptual artists
American expatriates in England
American film producers
Former members of new religious movements
Fugitives
Place of birth missing (living people)
Possibly living people
Year of birth uncertain